Miha Šimenc (born 21 December 1995) is a Slovenian cross-country skier. He competed at the 2018 and 2022 Winter Olympics.

Cross-country skiing results
All results are sourced from the International Ski Federation (FIS).

Olympic Games

World Championships

World Cup

Season standings

References

1995 births
Living people
Cross-country skiers at the 2018 Winter Olympics
Cross-country skiers at the 2022 Winter Olympics
Slovenian male cross-country skiers
Tour de Ski skiers
Olympic cross-country skiers of Slovenia
Cross-country skiers at the 2012 Winter Youth Olympics